Otherkin are a subculture of people who identify as not entirely human. Some otherkin believe their identity derives from reincarnation, a non-human soul, ancestry, symbolism, or metaphor. Others attribute it to unusual psychology and do not hold spiritual beliefs on the subject. Categories of otherkin include Fictionkin, those who identify as fictional characters; Conceptkin, who identify as abstract concepts; Weatherkin, who identify as weather systems; as well as a number of other more obscure categories. Joseph P. Laycock, assistant professor of religious studies at Texas State University, considers otherkin beliefs to have a religious dimension, but asserts that "the argument that Otherkin identity claims conform to a substantive definition of religion is problematic". Many otherkin themselves reject the notion that being otherkin is a religious belief. A controversial but frequently made analogy is to gender dysphoria, leading to the terms trans-species or trans-speciesism and species dysphoria.

Description

Otherkin may identify as mythical creatures, with others identifying as creatures from the natural world or from popular culture. Examples include: angels, demons, dragons, elves, fairies, sprites, wolves, foxes, horses, aliens, and fictional characters. Many otherkin believe in the existence of a multitude of parallel universes, and their belief in the existence of supernatural or sapient non-human beings is grounded in that idea. 

With regard to their online communities, otherkin largely function without formal authority structures and mostly focus on support and information gathering, often dividing into more specific groups based on kintype. There are occasional offline gatherings, but the otherkin network is mostly an online phenomenon.

Some otherkin claim to be especially empathic and attuned to nature. Some claim to be able to shapeshift mentally or astrally, meaning that they experience the sense of being in their particular form while not actually changing physically.

The therian and vampire subcultures are related to the otherkin community, and are considered part of it by most otherkin but are culturally and historically distinct movements of their own, despite some overlap in membership. The word “alterhuman” exists as an umbrella term which intends to encompass all of these subcultures, as well as others such as plurality.

Etymology
"Otherkin,” as an adjective, was defined in the Middle English Dictionary (1981) as "a different or an additional kind of, other kinds of".

The earliest recorded use of the term otherkin, in the context of a subculture, appeared in July 1990 and the variant otherkind was reported as early as April 1990. The word "otherkind" was initially coined from the word "elfinkind", to refer to non-elf others who joined the communities.

History
The otherkin subculture grew out of the elven online communities of the early-to-mid-1990s.

The oldest Internet resource for otherkin is the Elfinkind Digest, a mailing list started in 1990 by a student at the University of Kentucky for "elves and interested observers". Also in the early 1990s, newsgroups such as alt.horror.werewolves and alt.fan.dragons on Usenet, which were initially created for fans of these creatures in the context of fantasy and horror literature and films, also developed followings of individuals who identified as mythological beings.

On 6 February 1995, a document titled the "Elven Nation Manifesto" was posted to Usenet, including the groups alt.pagan and alt.magick. Enough people contacted the original author of the Elven Nation post in good faith for a planned mailing list to spin off from it.

Rich Dansky, who worked on the development of Changeling: The Dreaming, said that after the game's release the darkfae-l listserv had "a rampaging debate... over how the folks at White Wolf had gotten so much of their existence right", adding, "Finally, one of the list members came to the obvious conclusion that we'd gotten it right because we ourselves were in fact changelings." Dansky denied being non-human.

Reaction
Outside viewers may have varying opinions about people who identify as otherkin, ranging from considering them animal–human relationship pioneers to being psychologically dysfunctional. Reactions often range from disbelief to aggressive antagonism, especially online.

Otherkin have been called one of the world's most bizarre subcultures, and a religious movement (and a "quasi-religion") that "in some of its forms, largely only exists on the [Internet]". Although otherkin beliefs deviate from the definition of "religion", they share the primary interest in the paranormal. Religion scholar Joseph P. Laycock argues that the otherkin community serves existential and social functions commonly associated with religion, and regards it as an alternative nomos that sustains alternate ontologies.

According to Nick Mamatas, they represent a dissatisfaction with the modern world, and they have taken fairy lore out of its original context.

See also
 
Changeling
Clinical lycanthropy
Furry fandom
Skin-walker
Star people (New Age)
Supernumerary phantom limb
Therians
Totem
Walk-in
Tulpa
Xenogender

References

Further reading

“Why be human when you can be otherkin?” University of Cambridge, Research published 16 Jul 2016
"Otherkin are the internet’s punchline. They’re also our future". The Daily Dot, article published September 26th 2020

External links

Internet culture
Spirituality
Subcultures
1990s neologisms
Collective identity
Reincarnation
Mythological creatures
New religious movements